St. Joseph is a neighborhood two miles south of downtown Louisville, Kentucky, United States, and immediately east of the University of Louisville. The area was named after the St. Joseph's Infirmary hospital, which was established by the Sisters of Charity of Nazareth. The building, once located at the corner of Preston Street and Eastern Parkway, was razed in 1980.

The area was settled by mostly German immigrants from Bavaria in the 1900s. The housing stock is composed of bungalow and shotgun houses. St. Stephen's Cemetery, established 1851, is located in the northern part of the neighborhood.  The three Jewish cemeteries, Temple Cemetery, Adath Jeshuran Cemetery, and Keneseth Israel Cemetery are located next to each other in the southern part, more commonly referred to as the Bradley neighborhood.

St. Joseph's boundaries are I-65 to the west, Norfolk  Southern Railroad to the north, Eastern Parkway to the south, and Shelby Street to the east.

Demographics
As of 2000, the population of St. Joseph was 1,590 , of which 83.6% are white, 11.4% are black, 4.8% are listed as other, and Hispanics are 0.3%. College graduates are 15.8%, people without a high school degree are 25%, people with at least one year of college without a degree are 10.9%. Females are 50.8% of the population, while males are 49.2%.

See also
 History of the Germans in Louisville

References

External links
   Images of Saint Joseph (Louisville, Ky.) in the University of Louisville Libraries Digital Collections

Neighborhoods in Louisville, Kentucky
1900s establishments in Kentucky
Populated places established in the 1900s
German-American culture in Louisville, Kentucky